Eeva Ruoppa (May 2, 1932 Miehikkälä – April 27, 2013 Miehikkälä) was a cross-country skier from Finland who competed during the early 1960s. She won a bronze medal in the 3 × 5 km relay at the 1960 Winter Olympics in Squaw Valley.

Ruoppa also won a bronze medal in the 3 × 5 km relay at the 1962 FIS Nordic World Ski Championships in Zakopane.

She was a farmer.

Cross--country skiing results

Olympic Games
 1 medal – (1 bronze)

World Championships
 1 medal – (1 bronze)

External links
1960 Winter Olympic results 
World Championship results 
Eeva Ruoppa's profile at Sports Reference.com

1932 births
2013 deaths
People from Miehikkälä
Finnish female cross-country skiers
Cross-country skiers at the 1960 Winter Olympics
Cross-country skiers at the 1964 Winter Olympics
Olympic medalists in cross-country skiing
FIS Nordic World Ski Championships medalists in cross-country skiing
Medalists at the 1960 Winter Olympics
Olympic bronze medalists for Finland
Sportspeople from Kymenlaakso
20th-century Finnish women